"Diary" is a song by American singer-songwriter Alicia Keys from her second studio album, The Diary of Alicia Keys (2003). Written by Keys and Kerry Brothers, Jr. and produced by Keys, the song features the American group Tony! Toni! Toné! on bass, piano, guitar, organ and Wurlitzer, while Jermaine Paul provides uncredited additional vocals. It was released on May 24, 2004, as the album's third single. At one time, "Diary" had been released as a double A-side with "If I Ain't Got You".

"Diary" was nominated for Best R&B Performance by a Duo or Group with Vocals at the 2005 Grammy Awards. The song peaked at number eight on the Billboard Hot 100 and number two on the Hot R&B/Hip-Hop Songs. Its Hani remixes topped the Hot Dance Club Play chart in late 2004.

Critical reception
Mark Anthony Neal of PopMatters said the "sparse production" of the song "gives Keys ample space to work out her ideas."

Music video
The single's music video, directed by Lamont "Liquid" Burrell, Rod Isaacs, Jeff Robinson, and Brian Campbell, contains footage of several live concerts from both 2004's Verizon Ladies First Tour, which Keys took part in, and her own 2005 The Diary Tour.

The phone number
The song's lyrics tell listeners that they can reach Keys by calling a particular number, 489–4608, which was her former telephone number minus the area code when she lived in New York City, according to Keys' publicist, Lois Najarian. Callers who used the correct code (347) would have received a voicemail from Keys herself. However, after listening to the song, fans tried calling the number with different area codes, and one of them, 912, turned out to be the number of a retired pastor from Statesboro, Georgia, named J.D. Turner. He claims to have received more than twenty calls a day from Keys' fans in the weeks after the song's release. This led to a $95 phone bill resulting from charges associated with the *69 last-call return option, which he used to track down each caller. Turner has declined to change his number, having held it for fourteen years before the song's release. As of 2015, the number in the 347 area code is no longer in service and Turner retained it in the 912 code until his death in 2019.

Track listings and formats

US promotional CD single
 "Diary" (Radio Edit) – 4:28
 "Diary" (Instrumental) – 4:45
 "Diary" (Call Out Hook) – 0:10
 "Diary" (Radio Edit) (MP3 format) – 4:28

US promotional 12" Maxi-single
A1. "Diary" (Radio Edit) – 4:28 	
A2. "Diary" (Instrumental) – 4:45 	
B1. "Diary" (Album Version) – 4:45 	
B2. "Diary" (Acappella) – 4:45

US promotional 12" single (Hani Mixes)
A1. "Diary" (Hani Extended Club Mix) – 9:00   	
B1. "Diary" (Hani Mixshow) – 5:11 	
B2. "Diary" (Hani Dub) – 6:11

Digital EP (Dance Vault Remixes)
 "Diary" (Hani Mix) – 3:48
 "Diary" (Hani Mixshow) – 5:10
 "Diary" (Hani Extended Club Mix) – 8:58   		
 "Diary" (Hani Dub) – 6:08
 "Diary" (Music Video)

Personnel
 Alicia Keys – piano, producer, background vocals, vocals
 Elijah Baker – bass
 Tony Black – engineer
 Kerry Brothers, Jr. – digital programming
 Manny Marroquin – mixing
 Ann Mincieli – engineer
 Jermaine Paul – background vocals
 Herb Powers Jr. – mastering
 Tim Christian Riley – piano
 John "Jubu" Smith – guitar
 Carl "Rev" Wheeler – Wurlitzer, organ
 Dwayne "D. Wigg" Wiggins – guitar

Charts

Weekly charts

Year-end charts

Decade-end charts

Certifications

See also
 List of number-one dance singles of 2004 (U.S.)
 Billboard Year-End Hot 100 singles of 2004

References

2000s ballads
2003 songs
2004 singles
Alicia Keys songs
J Records singles
Songs written by Alicia Keys
Songs written by Kerry Brothers Jr.
Tony! Toni! Toné! songs
Song recordings produced by Alicia Keys